Princess Margarita of Baden (Margarete Alice Thyra Viktoria Marie Louise Scholastica; 14 July 1932 – 15 January 2013) was the only daughter of Berthold, Margrave of Baden, and Princess Theodora of Greece and Denmark. She was the eldest cousin of King Charles III and eldest niece of Queen Elizabeth II and Prince Philip, Duke of Edinburgh

Early life
Princess Margarita was born at Schloss Salem, Germany, on 14 July 1932 and grew up there. She was the eldest child and only daughter of Berthold, Margrave of Baden, and Princess Theodora of Greece and Denmark (1906–1969). Her father ran a school jointly with Kurt Hahn.

She came to live in London in 1948, and trained as a nurse at St Thomas' Hospital. During this time, she was often seen with her cousins Princess Christina of Hesse and Princess Beatrix of Hohenlohe-Langenburg. Princess Beatrix was briefly engaged to Princess Margarita's brother Prince Maximilian, and Princess Christina became Princess Margarita's future sister-in-law by marrying Prince Andrew of Yugoslavia. Also during this time, Princess Margarita attended the 1953 coronation of her aunt. While in London, she met Prince Tomislav, a member of the exiled Yugoslav royal family.

Marriage
On 5 June 1957, Princess Margarita married Prince Tomislav of Yugoslavia, younger brother of the former King Peter II of Yugoslavia, in a civil ceremony in Salem followed by Lutheran and Serbian Orthodox church services on 6 June. She wore a "plain white corded silk dress with a V-neckline, long sleeves, and a full skirt, and an old family train" with an orange blossom garland. Her train was carried by her first cousins Princes Welf and George of Hanover. Prince Philip, Duke of Edinburgh (her maternal uncle), and King Simeon of Bulgaria were among the guests. From this marriage were born:
Prince Nikola of Yugoslavia (born 15 March 1958, London)
Princess Katarina of Yugoslavia (born 28 November 1959, London)

The couple settled in the United Kingdom, running a fruit farm near Billingshurst in Sussex. They were divorced in 1981.

Later years
Princess Margarita was a champion of Serbian charities and was also president of the Convent of Martha and Mary in Moscow.

Princess Margarita died in Farnham, Surrey, on 15 January 2013 after a long illness. Her funeral was held at Serbian Orthodox Church of Saint Sava in Notting Hill on 24 January 2013. Her uncle the Duke of Edinburgh, Queen Anne-Marie of Greece, and her nephew Alexander, Crown Prince of Yugoslavia, were among the mourners. Princess Margarita was buried in the family cemetery at Stefansfeld near Baden, Germany, on 28 January 2013.

Ancestry

References

1932 births
2013 deaths
House of Zähringen
Yugoslav princesses
Princesses of Baden
People from Billingshurst